The 2013 Orienteering World Cup was the 19th edition of the Orienteering World Cup. It contained 13 competitions, which took place in New Zealand, Sweden, Norway, Finland and Switzerland.

Events

Women

Men

References

External sources
World Cup Overall Results
International Orienteering Federation

Orienteering World Cup seasons
Orienteering competitions